The 1991–92 Idaho Vandals men's basketball team represented the University of Idaho during the 1991–92 NCAA Division I men's basketball season. Members of the Big Sky Conference, the Vandals were led by second-year head coach Larry Eustachy and played their home games on campus at the Kibbie Dome in Moscow, Idaho.

Postseason results

|-
!colspan=6 style=| Big Sky tournament

References

External links
Sports Reference – Idaho Vandals: 1991–92 basketball season
Gem of the Mountains: 1992 University of Idaho yearbook – 1991–92 basketball season
Idaho Argonaut – student newspaper – 1992 editions

Idaho Vandals men's basketball seasons
Idaho
Idaho
Idaho